Wylde Green railway station is a railway station serving northern Wylde Green and Boldmere in Sutton Coldfield, Birmingham, West Midlands, England.

The station was opened on 2 June 1862, when the LNWR Birmingham to Sutton Coldfield railway line was completed and later operated by the LMS.

The station has a car park. Pedestrian and vehicular access is via Station Road, with pedestrian access also available from Highbridge Road. The platforms are above the former road, but below the latter.

Despite the station name, Chester Road railway station is located closer to Wylde Green's shopping centre, The Lanes.

Service

The station is served by West Midlands Trains with local Transport for West Midlands branded "Cross-City" services, operated by Class 323 electrical multiple units. The station is served by four trains an hour in each direction on weekdays and Saturdays (every 30 minutes on Sundays), with an average journey time to Birmingham New Street of around 18 minutes.

Notes

References
An Historical Survey Of Selected LMS Stations Vol. One Dr R Preston and R Powell Hendry. Oxford Pub. Co. (1982, Reprinted in 2001)

External links

Rail Around Birmingham and the West Midlands: Wylde Green railway station
Railways of Warwickshire entry

Sutton Coldfield
Railway stations in Birmingham, West Midlands
DfT Category E stations
Former London and North Western Railway stations
Railway stations in Great Britain opened in 1862
Railway stations served by West Midlands Trains
1862 establishments in England